Tasisat Sadamirkebir (also Romanized as Ta'sīsāt Sadamīrḵebīr and Ta'sīsāt-e Sadd-e Aamīrkabīr) is a village in Adaran Rural District, Asara District, Karaj County, Alborz Province, Iran. At the 2006 census, its population was 139, in 34 families.

References 

Populated places in Karaj County